Microlophus peruvianus, the Peru Pacific iguana, is a species of lava lizard endemic to the Ecuador, Peru, and Chile. The species is commonly attributed to the genus Microlophus but has been attributed to the genus Tropidurus.

Gallery

References

peruvianus
Lizards of South America
Reptiles of Chile
Reptiles of Ecuador
Reptiles of Peru
Reptiles described in 1830
Taxa named by René Lesson